Ctibor is a masculine Slavic name. It means honour and fight, warrior. Variants include: Ścibor, Stibor, Stebor, Czcibor.

Name Day 
Czech: 9 May
Slovak: 13 September
Polish: 13 September

Famous bearers 
 Czcibor - brother of Mieszko I.
 Ścibor z Gościeńczyc - bishop

 Belonging to Ostoja

 Śćibor ze Ściborzyc - Polish aristocrat
 Ignacy Ścibor Marchocki - reformator, Dux et Redux
 Zbigniew Ścibor-Rylski - general
 Aleksander Ścibor-Rylski - screenwriter, director

See also
 Ctiboř (disambiguation)
 Slavic names

References
PhDr. Miloslava Knappová

External links 
Ctibor on Behind The Name

Slavic masculine given names
Czech masculine given names
Slovak masculine given names
Polish masculine given names